Blues for Miles is an album by American jazz trumpeter Freddie Hubbard recorded in April 1992 in Tokyo and released on the Alfa and Evidence label. It features performances by Hubbard, Billy Childs, Tony Dumas, and Ralph Penland.

Reception
The Allmusic review by Alex Henderson states "Although not among Hubbard's great albums, Blues for Miles is generally likable".

Track listing
 "The Thrill Is Gone" (Lew Brown, Ray Henderson) - 8:04  
 "I'm a Fool to Want You" (Joel Herron, Frank Sinatra, Jack Wolf) -7:46  
 "Come Rain or Come Shine" (Harold Arlen, Johnny Mercer) - 8:25  
 "Autumn Leaves" (Joseph Kosma, Mercer, Jacques Prévert) - 6:22  
 "Gypsy Lament" (María Mendez Grever) - 5:00  
 "Blues for Miles (Hip-Hop Bop)" (Hubbard) - 7:30  
 "Skylark" (Hoagy Carmichael, Mercer) - 8:17  
 "Tenderly" (Walter Gross, Jack Lawrence) - 5:42

Personnel
Freddie Hubbard – trumpet
Billy Childs – piano
Tony Dumas – bass 
Ralph Penland – drums

References

1992 albums
Miles Davis tribute albums
Freddie Hubbard albums
Evidence Music albums